Chris Horrocks may refer to:

Chris Horrocks (soccer) (born 1954), former Canadian international and North American Soccer League player
Chris Horrocks (writer), associate professor of art history and author